Pike Township is one of the twenty-two townships of Coshocton County, Ohio, United States. As of the 2010 census the population was 638.

Geography
Located in the southwestern corner of the county, it borders the following townships:
Perry Township - north
Bedford Township - northeast
Washington Township - east
Cass Township, Muskingum County - southeast corner
Jackson Township, Muskingum County - south
Perry Township, Licking County - southwest
Fallsbury Township, Licking County - west

No municipalities are located in Pike Township, although the unincorporated community of West Carlisle lies in the township's northeast.

Topographical features in Pike Township include the Ashcraft and Graham Ridges.

Name and history
It is one of eight Pike Townships statewide.

Pike Township was organized in August, 1818.

Government
The township is governed by a three-member board of trustees, who are elected in November of odd-numbered years to a four-year term beginning on the following January 1. Two are elected in the year after the presidential election and one is elected in the year before it. There is also an elected township fiscal officer, who serves a four-year term beginning on April 1 of the year after the election, which is held in November of the year before the presidential election. Vacancies in the fiscal officership or on the board of trustees are filled by the remaining trustees.

References

External links
County website

Townships in Coshocton County, Ohio
Townships in Ohio